Card is a surname. Notable people with the surname include:

Andrew Card, politician, Secretary of Transportation under George H.W. Bush and White House Chief of Staff under George W. Bush
Charles Ora Card (1839–1906), American Mormon founder of Cardston, Alberta
David Card, Canadian labour economist and professor at the University of California, Berkeley
Hudson Card (born 2001), American football player
Michael Card, American Christian singer-songwriter, author, and radio host
Orson Scott Card, science fiction author

See also

Cari (name)